George Frederick Playter (31 August 1809 – 24 October 1866) was a Canadian minister, historian, and author who wrote The History of Methodism in Canada: With an Account of the Rise and Progress of the Work of God Among the Canadian Indian Tribes; and Occasional Notices of the Civil Affairs of the Province. It was published in Toronto by Anson Green, 1862.

Born in England in 1809, in 1832 Playter immigrated to Montreal, where he was hired as a printer. He was a minister of the Wesleyan Methodist Church in Toronto and elsewhere throughout Eastern Ontario.  His frequently cited book, The History of Methodism in Canada, was published as volume 1.  Playter died before volume 2 could be published.

From 1844 to 1846, Playter was editor of The Christian Guardian, the predecessor of today's United Church Observer, one of the oldest and most respected church publications in Canada.

References

1809 births
1866 deaths
19th-century Canadian male writers
19th-century Canadian historians
19th-century Canadian journalists
Canadian historians of religion
Canadian male journalists
Canadian Methodist ministers
Canadian newspaper editors
Editors of Christian publications
Pre-Confederation Ontario people
Wesleyan Methodists